Who I Am may refer to:

Albums 
 Who I Am (Alan Jackson album)
 Who I Am (Amy Pearson album), 2008
 Who I Am (Beverley Knight album), 2002
 Who I Am (Cory Marks album), 2020
 Who I Am (David Ruffin album), 1975
 Who I Am (Jason Castro album), 2010
 Who I Am (Jessica Andrews album), 2001
 Who I Am (Nick Jonas & the Administration album)
 Who I Am, by Alice Peacock
 Who I Am, by Gary Wright
 Who I AM (Abraham Mateo album), 2014
 Who I Am (Blanca EP), 2015

Songs 
 "Who I Am" (Nick Jonas & the Administration song), 2009
 "Who I Am" (Jessica Andrews song), 2000
 "Who I Am" (Blog 27 song), 2006
 "Who I Am" (Ashley Tisdale song), 2007
 "Who I Am" (Lena Katina song)
 "Who I Am" (Shannon Noll song), 2017
 "Who I Am" (Maroon 5 song), 2017
 "Who I Am", a song by Abraham Mateo on his album Who I AM, 2014
 "Who I Am", a song by After Forever on their self-titled album, 2007
 "Who I Am", a song by Code Orange on their album Underneath, 2020
 "Who I Am", a song by Cory Marks from his album Who I Am, 2020
 "Who I Am", a song by David Archuleta from his album The Other Side of Down, 2010
 "Who I Am", a song by Magna-Fi, on their album VerseChorusKillMe, 2007
 "Who I Am", a song by Memphis May Fire on their album Broken, 2018
 "Who I Am", a song by miwa on her single DAITAN!, 2020
 "Who I Am", a song by Natasha Bedingfield from the 2014 film The Pirate Fairy
 "Who I Am", a song by Notaker & Declan James feat. Karra, 2017
 "Who I Am", a song by Pusha T on his album My Name Is My Name, 2013
 "Who I Am", a song by Sandra from her album Back to Life, 2009
 "Who I Am", a song by Trapt on their album Amalgamation, 1999
 "Who I Am", a song by Wage War on their Pressure, 2019
 "Who I Am", a song from the Bratz Rock Angelz soundtrack, 2005

Books
 Who I Am (book), a memoir by Pete Townshend